David Gilbert Thomas (4 August 1928, London, England – 9 May 2015, Torrington, Connecticut) was a chemist and solid-state physicist, known for his work at Bell Labs on the optical properties of semiconductors.

Education and career
Thomas was educated at Harrow School and at The Putney School in Vermont, before he matriculated at Oxford University, where received his three chemistry degrees: studying firstly at Oriel College for his BA (awarded 1949) and MA (awarded 1950); then at Merton College for his DPhil, awarded in 1952. From 1952 to 1954 he was a researcher for the Royal Military College in Kingston, Canada, and then in 1954 joined Bell Laboratories, where he worked for 38 years. In 1960 he became a U.S. citizen.

In 1969 he received, for joint research with John Hopfield, the Oliver E. Buckley Condensed Matter Prize of the American Physical Society.

Family
Thomas's wife, June, whom he married in 1957, died in January 2015. He was survived by his daughters Virginia S. Thomas and Victoria C. Thomas, as well as, granddaughters Eliza K. Lupone and Madeline J. Lupone.

References

1928 births
2015 deaths
People educated at Harrow School
Alumni of the University of Oxford
British emigrants to the United States
Scientists at Bell Labs
Fellows of the American Physical Society
Oliver E. Buckley Condensed Matter Prize winners
Alumni of Merton College, Oxford